This article is about the particular significance of the year 1704 to Wales and its people.

Incumbents
Lord Lieutenant of North Wales (Lord Lieutenant of Anglesey, Caernarvonshire, Denbighshire, Flintshire, Merionethshire, Montgomeryshire) – Hugh Cholmondeley, 1st Earl of Cholmondeley
Lord Lieutenant of South Wales (Lord Lieutenant of Glamorgan, Brecknockshire, Cardiganshire, Carmarthenshire, Monmouthshire, Pembrokeshire, Radnorshire) – Thomas Herbert, 8th Earl of Pembroke

Bishop of Bangor –  John Evans
Bishop of Llandaff – William Beaw
Bishop of St Asaph – George Hooper (until 14 March); William Beveridge (from 16 July)
Bishop of St Davids – vacant

Events
6 April - Sir Humphrey Mackworth proposes to the SPCK the "Erection of libraries in Wales".
May - Erasmus Lewis becomes secretary to Robert Harley at the Northern Department.
July - Richard Vaughan of Corsygedol becomes Constable of Harlech Castle.
9 October - Roger Griffith is installed as archdeacon of Brecon.
date unknown 
Jane Kemeys of Cefn Mabli marries Sir John Tynte, 2nd Baronet, resulting in an alliance between two important families and the beginning of the Kemeys-Tynte dynasty.

Arts and literature

New books
John Morgan - Bloeddnad Ofnadwy yr Utcorn Diweddaf (posthumously published)
Robert Nelson - A Companion for the Festivals and Fasts of the Church of England

Births
May - Ann Maddocks, the "maid of Cefn Ydfa" (died 1727)
December - Richard Herbert, politician (died 1754)

date unknown - Robert Jones, politician (died 1774)

Deaths
May - William Wynne, historian, about 33
9 August - Richard Bulkeley, 3rd Viscount Bulkeley, about 46, politician
November - Sir John Williams, 2nd Baronet, of Llangibby, about 53

See also
1704 in Scotland

References

1700s in Wales